In mathematics, Varadhan's lemma is a result from large deviations theory named after S. R. Srinivasa Varadhan.  The result gives information on the asymptotic distribution of a statistic φ(Zε) of a family of random variables Zε as ε becomes small in terms of a rate function for the variables.

Statement of the lemma
Let X be a regular topological space; let (Zε)ε>0 be a family of random variables taking values in X; let με be the law (probability measure) of Zε.  Suppose that (με)ε>0 satisfies the large deviation principle with good rate function I : X → [0, +∞].  Let ϕ  : X → R be any continuous function.  Suppose that at least one of the following two conditions holds true: either the tail condition

where 1(E) denotes the indicator function of the event E; or, for some γ > 1, the moment condition

Then

See also
Laplace principle (large deviations theory)

References
  (See theorem 4.3.1)

Asymptotic analysis
Lemmas
Probability theorems
Theorems in statistics
Large deviations theory